IDIN (International Development Innovation Network) is a global network led by Massachusetts Institute of Technology's D-Lab funded by United States Agency for International Development and Global Development Lab.

History 

IDIN started working in 2007 as a project of D-Lab in Massachusetts Institute of Technology. IDIN is a network of 700 plus innovators in 57 countries who got selected annually basis and participate in IDIN Organized Summits called International Development Design Summit (IDDS). First International Development Design Summit organized by MIT D-Lab in 2007.

Grants and fundings 
IDIN provides microgrants and training grants to innovators who are developing projects for social change around the world.

References

External links 
 

Massachusetts Institute of Technology